Frédéric Cottier (born 5 February 1954) is a French equestrian and Olympic medalist. He was born in Neuilly-sur-Seine. He won a bronze medal in show jumping at the 1988 Summer Olympics in Seoul.

References

External links

1954 births
Living people
French male equestrians
Olympic equestrians of France
Olympic bronze medalists for France
Equestrians at the 1984 Summer Olympics
Equestrians at the 1988 Summer Olympics
Sportspeople from Neuilly-sur-Seine
Olympic medalists in equestrian
Medalists at the 1988 Summer Olympics